Goplana is a genus of rust fungi in the Chaconiaceae family. The widespread genus contains 12 species that grow on dicots.

Species
Goplana andina
Goplana aporosae
Goplana australis
Goplana cissi
Goplana concinna
Goplana dioscoreae
Goplana ecuadorica
Goplana espeletiae
Goplana indica
Goplana micheliae
Goplana mirabilis
Goplana ribis-andicolae

References

External links

Pucciniales